Xylopia acutiflora (Dunal.) A. Rich is a small tree that grows up to 15 m high, it belongs to the Annonaceae family.

Description 
Brown pubescent twigs mixed with erect and short hairs. Leaf blades chartaceous, concolorous -  slightly discolorous, elliptic - elliptic-lanceolate, larger blades, 5.3 - 11.7 cm long and 2.3 - 4.3 cm wide; acute to acuminate at apex and cuneate at base. Flowers are solitary  Fruit green - reddish tinged exterior, scarlet endocarp, up to born on a pedicel. Seed, ovate- ellipsoid, monocarps have two rows of seed.

Distribution 
Native to West Africa, found in lowland forests.

Uses 
In Ghana and among the Ehotile people of Akanland, root extracts from the species is used as a sexual stimulant and as a chewing stick. Seeds are crushed and used as spice, wood obtained are used as material to make canoe paddles, spears or bows.

References 

Flora of West Tropical Africa
acutiflora